{{DISPLAYTITLE:C27H29N3O6}}
The molecular formula C27H29N3O6 (molar mass: 491.53 g/mol, exact mass: 491.2056 u) may refer to:

 Barnidipine, a calcium channel blocker
 Mepirodipine, a calcium channel blocker